Glorious: The Singles 97–07 is a compilation album by Australian singer-songwriter Natalie Imbruglia, celebrating ten years since the release of her first album, Left of the Middle. It was released on 10 September 2007 in the United Kingdom and on 22 September 2007 in Australia. The album consists of all nine singles released from Imbruglia's past three studio albums as well as five new songs including the single "Glorious". A limited edition version includes a bonus DVD of Imbruglia's music videos. The album peaked at number 5 on the UK Albums Chart. It was certified Gold in the UK on 12 October 2007. The lead single "Glorious" was digitally released in the United States on 26 June 2012, but the album itself has yet to receive a release in the country.

Track listing

 signifies a co-producer

Charts

Certifications and sales

Release history

References

Natalie Imbruglia albums
2007 compilation albums